The Ilișoara Mare is a left tributary of the river Ilva in Romania. It flows into the Ilva north of Lunca Bradului.

References

Rivers of Romania
Rivers of Mureș County